Gareth John Williams (born 12 December 1973) is a former English cricketer.  Williams was a left-handed batsman who bowled right-arm fast-medium.  He was born in Birmingham, Warwickshire.

Williams represented the Worcestershire Cricket Board in List A cricket.  His debut List A match against Staffordshire in the 2001 Cheltenham & Gloucester Trophy.  From 2001 to 2003, he represented the Board in 5 List A matches, the last of which came against Worcestershire in the 2003 Cheltenham & Gloucester Trophy.  In his 5 List A matches, he took 5 wickets at a bowling average of 28.20, with best figures of 3/61.

References

External links
Gareth Williams at Cricinfo

1973 births
Living people
Cricketers from Birmingham, West Midlands
English cricketers
Worcestershire Cricket Board cricketers
English cricketers of the 21st century